Philip Boulton (born 14 December 1986) is a retired English rugby union player who played for Championship side, Coventry RFC as a tighthead prop. His former clubs include Rotherham Titans, Leicester Tigers, Nuneaton RFC and Bedford Blues. He has also represented the England Counties XV side.

Early life
Boulton was born in Lincoln, Lincolnshire and grew up in a small village. He didn't begin to play rugby until he was in secondary school at De Aston School in Market Rasen. He had initially tried his hand at playing football. He began playing for Lincoln RFC in 1998 and progressed through the age groups before leaving in 2003, when, after leaving secondary school at the age of 16, he was offered a rugby scholarship at Worksop College.

Career
At the age of 18, Boulton began training with Rotherham Titans and later progressed to play for the club before being invited to join the academy setup at Leicester Tigers under the stewardship of Richard Cockerill. After signing a two-year scholarship deal he was loaned out to Nuneaton RFC before returning to Rotherham Titans the season after. He eventually left Leicester after failing to make the first team and moved on to the Bedford Blues on a permanent deal. In 2008 Boulton played for the England Counties XV against the United States Eagles.

Boulton captained Coventry RFC to win the National League 1 in 2017–18.

Personal life

Boulton was a Leicester Tigers fan as a youngster.

References

1986 births
Living people
Rugby union props
Leicester Tigers players
Rotherham Titans players
Nuneaton R.F.C. players
Bedford Blues players
People educated at De Aston School